Parametric statistics is a branch of statistics which assumes that sample data comes from a population that can be adequately modeled by a probability distribution that has a fixed set of parameters.  Conversely a non-parametric model does not assume an explicit (finite-parametric) mathematical form for the distribution when modeling the data. However, it may make some assumptions about that distribution, such as continuity or symmetry.

Most well-known statistical methods are parametric. Regarding nonparametric (and semiparametric) models, Sir David Cox has said, "These typically involve fewer assumptions of structure and distributional form but usually contain strong assumptions about independencies".

Example
The normal family of distributions all have the same general shape and are parameterized by mean and standard deviation. That means that if the mean and standard deviation are known and if the distribution is normal, the probability of any future observation lying in a given range is known.  

Suppose that we have a sample of 99 test scores with a mean of 100 and a standard deviation of 1. If we assume all 99 test scores are random observations from a normal distribution, then we predict there is a 1% chance that the 100th test score will be higher than 102.33 (that is, the mean plus 2.33 standard deviations), assuming that the 100th test score comes from the same distribution as the others.  Parametric statistical methods are used to compute the 2.33 value above, given 99 independent observations from the same normal distribution.

A non-parametric estimate of the same thing is the maximum of the first 99 scores. We don't need to assume anything about the distribution of test scores to reason that before we gave the test it was equally likely that the highest score would be any of the first 100. Thus there is a 1% chance that the 100th score is higher than any of the 99 that preceded it.

History 
Parametric statistics was mentioned by R. A. Fisher in his work Statistical Methods for Research Workers in 1925, which created the foundation for modern statistics.

See also

 Aggregated distribution
 All models are wrong
 Inverse problem
 Parametric model
 Sufficient statistic

References

 
Statistical inference